Pogochaetia solitaria is a moth in the family Gelechiidae. It was described by Otto Staudinger in 1880. It is found in Spain, France, Italy, Switzerland, Austria, Greece, Turkey and northern Iran.

The wingspan is 15–17 mm. The forewings are blackish with reddish-grey scales and three to four large black dots. The hindwings are light grey.

The larvae feed on Saponaria ocymoides.

Subspecies
Pogochaetia solitaria solitaria (Greece, Turkey, northern Iran: Elburs mountains)
Pogochaetia solitaria ocymoidella (Walsingham, 1900) (Spain, southern France, Alps)

References

Gnorimoschemini
Moths described in 1880